is a Japanese politician of the Liberal Democratic Party, a member of the House of Councillors in the Diet (national legislature). A graduate of Tsurumi University, she was elected for the first time in 2007.

References

External links 
 Official website in Japanese.

Members of the House of Councillors (Japan)
Female members of the House of Councillors (Japan)
Japanese dentists
People from Hiroshima Prefecture
Living people
1949 births
Liberal Democratic Party (Japan) politicians